Cantlop is a small village in the English county of Shropshire. It is part of the civil parish of Berrington.

Nearby villages include Condover, to the west of Cantlop, and the village of Berrington to the north-west, on the other side of the Cound Brook which flows to the north of Cantlop, and Pitchford to the south. The area is largely agricultural.

Etymology
Various meanings have been suggested for the name, such as an enclosed or cut-off valley or an enclosure in a waste or common.

History

To the north of the village there is a cast-iron single-span bridge — the Cantlop Bridge — now generally accepted to have been designed by Thomas Telford, who was the County Surveyor of Shropshire. The bridge crosses the Cound Brook and was built in 1818. Today it no longer takes road traffic, as a modern bridge exists adjacent to it, but is open to pedestrians.

The bridge carried the 1797 turnpike road from Shrewsbury to Acton Burnell, which continued through Cantlop itself. A late 18th-century milestone exists just to the north of Cantlop Cross (the crossroad junction at Cantlop) which marks  from (the centre of) Shrewsbury (written on the milestone as "Salop"); it is now Grade II listed.

Centre of Shropshire
On 1 August 2014, on BBC Radio Shropshire, it was confirmed by Andy Stegall from Ordnance Survey that Cantlop is the geographic centre of the ceremonial county of Shropshire. This is also shown on the Ordnance Survey's mapping of the ceremonial counties, where the name of Shropshire is centred immediately to the southwest of Cantlop Cross.

References

External links

Villages in Shropshire
Extremities of Shropshire